Jeanie P. Duniphan (born August 31, 1946) is an American former politician. She served in the South Dakota Senate from 2003 to 2005 and in the House of Representatives from 1995 to 2002.

References

1946 births
Living people
Politicians from Rapid City, South Dakota
Businesspeople from South Dakota
Women state legislators in South Dakota
Republican Party members of the South Dakota House of Representatives
Republican Party South Dakota state senators
20th-century American politicians
20th-century American women politicians
21st-century American politicians
21st-century American women politicians